The Cerberus-class breastwork monitor was a pair of breastwork monitors built for the Royal Navy in the 1860s.

Design
Also referred to as "ironclads" and "turret ships", the ships of the Cerberus class were designed by Sir Edward Reed following requests by several dominions and colonies of the British Empire for warships to be used as coastal defence ships.

The size of the ships was limited by cost. They were designed and built to be used as local defence ships, and it was not expected that they would ever need to be deployed far away from their bases. It was therefore possible to design them without sails or rigging and dependent only upon their engines, with a resulting limitation in their effective range.

The absence of masts and rigging allowed more weight to be worked into the ship's armour. This also meant it was possible to arm the ships with two gun turrets, one fore and one aft, which had wholly unobstructed fields of fire over the bow and stern, and on wide arcs amidships. The turrets were mounted on the upper deck and hence had a greater height above water and a correspondingly greater command than guns mounted on the main deck. The turret armament provided an additional advantage of allowing the ships to have a low freeboard. This increased the steadiness of the ship and allowed the hull armour to be applied more thickly over a more limited height of exposed hull.

Construction

Ships
 HMVS Cerberus- harbour defence vessel at Melbourne, Australia
  – harbour defence vessel at Bombay, India

See also
  – harbour defence vessel at Bombay, India, built to a similar, but smaller, design.

Notes and references

Footnotes

Sources
 
 Brown, D.K.,  Warrior to Dreadnought, Warship Development 1860–1906, 
 
 

Monitor classes